The 33rd Air Base is a Polish Air Force base, located near Powidz. The base functions within the structure of the Polish Air Force and is part of the three wings of Powidz air transport command. It was officially constituted on 1 January 2000 as the 21st airbase, replacing the disbanded 7th Bomber-Reconnaissance Aviation Regiment, then redesignated to its current name on 1 January 2001. In 2010, the 2nd Airlift Squadron disbanded and its units were distributed among the newly formed units of the 33rd Air Base.

From the summer of 2019, the base will be the site of a depot and storage site for United States Army combat vehicles in Poland. It will be mostly funded by NATO's NATO Security Investment Program, and cost around US$210m, with the USA's component capped at around 20-25%. The US Army Corps of Engineers has made an industry solicitation in 2018 requesting tree-cutting services for  around the base. Two US investments could be sacrificed to pay for President Trump's border wall with Mexico: A bulk fuel storage facility at US$21m, and a "rail extension and railhead" project budgeted at US$14m.

References

Airports in Poland
Polish Air Force bases
Łask County
Buildings and structures in Łódź Voivodeship